The 1979–80 Alliance Premier League was the inaugural season of the Alliance Premier League – the first league outside the Football League to cover the whole of England.

Overview
Between 1979 and 2004 the single-division Alliance Premier League formed Level 5 of the English football league system. Since 2004 two regional divisions were added at Level 6.

The founder members of the Alliance Premier League were drawn from the Southern League and Northern Premier League, covering the country from Yeovil Town in the South West to Barrow in the far North. One club from Wales – Bangor City – also participated.

Teams
From the Northern Premier League

 Altrincham
 Bangor City
 Barrow
 Boston United
 Northwich Victoria
 Scarborough
 Stafford Rangers

From the Southern League

 AP Leamington
 Barnet
 Bath City
 Gravesend & Northfleet
 Kettering Town
 Maidstone United
 Nuneaton Borough
 Redditch United
 Telford United
 Wealdstone
 Weymouth
 Yeovil Town
 Worcester City

League table

Results

Promotion and relegation

Promoted
 Frickley Athletic (from the Northern Premier League)

Relegated
 Redditch United (to the Southern League Midland Division)

Top scorers

Election to the Football League
As winners of the Alliance Premier League, Altrincham won the right to apply for election to the Football League to replace one of the four bottom teams in the 1979–80 Football League Fourth Division. The vote went as follows:

As a result of this, Altrincham failed to be elected to membership of the Football League, falling just one point behind Fourth Division's bottom club Rochdale.

References

External links
 1979–80 Football Conference Results
 Re-election Results 

National League (English football) seasons
5